Helen Friedman, Ph. D is a clinical psychologist, therapist, and radio show host in St. Louis, Missouri. She is an associate clinical (adjunct) professor at the Saint Louis University School of Medicine, a past  president of the St. Louis Psychological Association, and on the advisory board of the Society for the Advancement of Sexual Health. In full-time private practice, she works in the general areas of anxiety, depression, grief, sexual and relationship issues. Specialties include sexual trauma, sexual compulsivity, dissociative disorders, and gender identity. Her award-winning radio show, "PsychTalk," was featured on KDHX and ran for over seven years. Her work and commentary has been featured in USA Today, the New York Times,  the Washington Post, Los Angeles Times, the Boston Globe, the New York Post, Psychology Today, Cosmopolitan, New Woman, Mademoiselle, Redbook,  Salon.com, among others.

References

US News and World Report biography
Family Resource article by Friedman

External links
Times article featuring Friedman 
Psychology Today article on Psych-Radio
Salon.com article on Macrophilia featuring Friedman

American women psychologists
21st-century American psychologists
Living people
Year of birth missing (living people)
21st-century American women